Byron Young (born March 13, 1998) is an American football defensive end for the Tennessee Volunteers. He previously played for Georgia Military College.

High school career
Young attended Carvers Bay High School in Hemingway, South Carolina. Barely recruited coming out of high school, Young worked at Dollar General to make ends meet before walking on at Georgia Military College.

College career
Following one season at Georgia Military College, Young was ranked the number 10 Junior College prospect and committed to Tennessee over Ole Miss. Initially a backup in his first season at Tennessee in 2021, Young started the last 8 games recording 46 total tackles and led the team with 5.5 sacks.

Prior to the 2022 season, Young was named a member of the preseason All-SEC first team. In the Volunteers Week 6 game against LSU, Young recorded 2.5 sacks and was named the SEC defensive lineman of the week for his performance.

References

External links
Tennessee Volunteers bio

Living people
Tennessee Volunteers football players
American football defensive ends
Players of American football from South Carolina
1998 births
People from Georgetown, South Carolina